{{DISPLAYTITLE:QoI}}

Qo inhibitors (QoI), or quinone outside inhibitors, are a group of fungicides used in agriculture. Some of these fungicides are among the most popular in the world. QoI are chemical compounds which act at the quinol outer binding site of the cytochrome bc1 complex.

Most QI common names end in -strobin and so are often called strobs. QoI's are the resulting fusion of three fungicides families, the well-known family of strobilurins and two new families, represented by fenamidone and famoxadone. Some strobilurins are azoxystrobin, kresoxim-methyl, picoxystrobin, pyraclostrobin, and trifloxystrobin.

Usage
QoI fungicides are used on a wide range of crops, such as cereals, vines, pome fruits, cucurbits, tomatoes, and potatoes.

For example, they are used as fungicides for cereals, against Erysiphe graminis f.sp tritici responsible for the powdery mildew in wheat or against Septoria tritici, responsible for septoria leaf spot in wheat.

They are also commonly used for vine culture, against Plasmopara viticola, responsible for downy mildew or in oïdium treatment.

List

 QIs:
 methoxy-acrylates:
 azoxystrobin
 coumoxystrobin
 enoxastrobin
 flufenoxystrobin
 picoxystrobin
 pyraoxystrobin
 methoxy-acetamides:
 mandestrobin
 methoxy-carbamates:
 pyraclostrobin
 pyrametostrobin
 triclopyricarb
 oximino-acetates:
 kresoxim-methyl
 trifloxystrobin
 oximino-acetamides:
 dimoxystrobin
 fenaminstrobin
 metominostrobin
 orysastrobin
 oxazolidine-diones:
 famoxadone
 dihydro-dioxazines:
 fluoxastrobin
 imidazolinones:
 fenamidone
 benzyl-carbamates:
 pyribencarb
 QI subgroup A:
 tetrazolinones:
 metyltetraprole

Resistance

Main group resistance
Almost all these fungicides are in the same cross-resistance group (FRAC 11) and must be managed carefully to avoid the appearance of fungicide resistance. All group 11s are cross-resistant with each other. Some fungicide resistance has been observed in many crop pathogens (such as in the case of wheat powdery mildew),   Resistance to group 11 is conferred by cytochrome b mutations G143A and F129L, and by other mechanisms.

Tetrazolinone resistance
The tetrazolinones consist of only one molecule, metyltetraprole. This constitutes FRAC 11A. 11A is not cross-resistant with 11 resistance conferred by G143A.

See also 
plant pathology
integrated farming

References

External links
Fungicides Resistance Action Committee, QoI Includes information on QoI working group activities.
Gray Leaf Spot Resistance to Strobulurins

Fungicides
Quinone outside inhibitors